On December 29, 2017, in Helwan, Cairo, Egypt, a gunman opened fire at the Coptic Orthodox Church of Saint Menas and a nearby shop owned by a Coptic man, killing ten citizens and a police officer and injuring around ten people. He was wounded by police and arrested. Investigators said he had carried out several attacks in the last year.
Later, Amaq News Agency described that terrorist attack was carried out by a person belonging to the Islamic State group.

See also 

 Persecution of Copts
 2011 Alexandria bombing
 2011 Imbaba church attacks
 Botroseya Church bombing
 Christianity in Egypt
 Coptic Orthodox Church
 Kosheh massacres
 Nag Hammadi massacre
 2017 Minya attack

References

2017 in Christianity
2017 murders in Egypt
December 2017 crimes in Africa
December 2017 events in Africa
2010s in Cairo
ISIL terrorist incidents in Egypt
Islamic terrorist incidents in 2017
Islamist attacks on churches
Mass murder in 2017
Mass shootings in Egypt
Persecution of Copts by ISIL
Religiously motivated violence in Egypt
Terrorist incidents in Egypt in 2017
2017 attack